USA-64, also known as GPS II-9 and GPS SVN-15, was an American navigation satellite which formed part of the Global Positioning System. It was the last of nine Block II GPS satellites to be launched, which were the first operational GPS satellites to fly. It was also the last Block II satellite to be retired from service.

Background 
Global Positioning System (GPS) was developed by the U.S. Department of Defense to provide all-weather round-the-clock navigation capabilities for military ground, sea, and air forces. Since its implementation, GPS has also become an integral asset in numerous civilian applications and industries around the globe, including recreational used (e.g., boating, aircraft, hiking), corporate vehicle fleet tracking, and surveying. GPS employs 24 spacecraft in 20,200 km circular orbits inclined at 55.0°. These vehicles are placed in 6 orbit planes with four operational satellites in each plane.

GPS Block 2 was the operational system, following the demonstration system composed of Block 1 (Navstar 1 - 11) spacecraft. These spacecraft were 3-axis stabilized, nadir pointing using reaction wheels. Dual solar arrays supplied 710 watts of power. They used S-band (SGLS) communications for control and telemetry and Ultra high frequency (UHF) cross-link between spacecraft. The payload consisted of two L-band navigation signals at 1575.42 MHz (L1) and 1227.60 MHz (L2). Each spacecraft carried 2 rubidium and 2 Cesium clocks and nuclear detonation detection sensors. Built by Rockwell Space Systems for the U.S. Air force, the spacecraft measured 5.3 m across with solar panels deployed and had a design life of 7.5 years.

Launch 
USA-64 was launched at 21:56:00 UTC on 1 October 1990, atop a Delta II launch vehicle, flight number D199, flying in the 6925 configuration. The launch took place from Launch Complex 17A (LC-17A) at the Cape Canaveral Air Force Station (CCAFS), and placed USA-64 into a transfer orbit. The satellite raised itself into medium Earth orbit using a Star-37XFP apogee motor.

Mission 
It operated in slot 5 of plane D of the GPS constellation. It had a design life of 7.5 years, having been added from active service on 17 November 2006 for testing, and ceased operations on 14 March 2007.

References 

GPS satellites
USA satellites
Spacecraft launched in 1990